Donald Adamson  (born 30 March 1939), is a British literary scholar, author and historian.

Books which he has written include Blaise Pascal: Mathematician, Physicist, and Thinker about God and The Curriers' Company: A Modern History. His works are regarded as a gateway to European literature.

Biography 
Born at Culcheth, Lancashire, Adamson was brought up on a family farm at Lymm, Cheshire where his mother's Booth family were resident for over 500 years; his maternal uncle, and godfather, was Major Gerald Loxley. His father's family was of Scottish extraction, and a distant cousin was Mgr Thomas Adamson.

From 1949 to 1956 he attended Manchester Grammar School where he was taught by, amongst others, Eric James (later Lord James of Rusholme). He became a scholar of Magdalen College, Oxford, and was tutored by Austin Gill and Sir Malcolm Pasley, graduating BA in 1959, proceeding MA in 1963. He won the Zaharoff Travelling Scholar Prize of the University of Oxford for 1959–60, thereafter studying at the Paris-Sorbonne University, being tutored by Pierre-Georges Castex. In 1962 he took the degree of BLitt, proceeding Master of Letters (MLitt); his thesis for the degree of Doctor of Philosophy (DPhil), entitled "Balzac and the Visual Arts", was supervised by Jean Seznec of All Souls College, Oxford.

Adamson spent much of his teaching career at university level, although he taught at Manchester Grammar School from 1962 to 1964 and then at the Lycée Louis-le-Grand from 1964 to 1965. He taught at St George's Church of England School, Gravesend in 1968.  In 1969 he joined Goldsmiths' College, where his teaching did much to enhance the University of London's standing throughout French academic circles. In 1971 he was appointed a Recognised Teacher in the Faculty of Arts of the University of London and,  in 1972, a member of its Faculty of Education, holding both appointments until 1989. He served as Chairman of the Board of Examiners at London University from 1983 until 1986, attracting candidates for undergraduate degrees including external students from the UK and throughout Europe as well as from Asian countries including Singapore and Hong Kong. In 2021 he was awarded Hon FCIL.

In 1989 he was elected a Visiting Fellow of Wolfson College, Cambridge, being a promoter in the fields of public policy on the arts, libraries and museums. By speaking, writing and, through the Bow Group, submitting (with Sir John Hannam MP) written and oral evidence to a Parliamentary select committee, he helped to establish the National Heritage Memorial Fund. Adamson was a member of the judging committee of the Museum of the Year Awards from 1979 to 1983, and has donated to the National Library of Wales and the National Library of Malta.

He served the Order of St John of Jerusalem from 1981, becoming Deputy Director of Ceremonies of the Priory of England and the Islands (the Isle of Wight, the Isles of Scilly, the Channel Islands and the Isle of Man) until 2008.

From 19 October 2012 until 11 October 2013 Adamson served as Master (and from 2015, Senior Court Assistant) of the Worshipful Company of Curriers of the City of London and during his term of office he launched The Curriers' Company London History Essay Prize, which is competed for annually by young graduates of British universities; he stepped down from executive oversight in 2021.

As Master of the Curriers' Company he also established sixteen annual prizes in mathematics and history for pupils aged 14 to 15 at four London academies. In 1976 he became a liveryman of the Haberdashers' Company., of which he is now a freeman.

His personal interests include the history of religion and genealogy. He is also an enthusiastic art collector, mainly of Western European art, including a work of Eugène Isabey, and drawings of the 18th and 19th centuries.

He and his wife divide their time between homes in Kent and Polperro, Cornwall; Dr Adamson contributes much on the history of Cornwall.

Honours and fellowships 

  Knight of Justice, Order of St John of Jerusalem
  Service Medal, Order of St John of Jerusalem (with bar)
  Officier, Ordre des Arts et des Lettres
  Chevalier, Ordre des Palmes académiques
  Cross of Merit, Order pro Merito Melitensi
 Fellow of the Royal Society of Literature
 Fellow of the Royal Historical Society
 Fellow of the Society of Antiquaries of London
 Honorary Fellow of the Chartered Institute of Linguists
 Justice of the Peace of the City of London, later Cornwall.

Scope of his writing 
The Genesis of Le Cousin Pons, substantially the text of Adamson's (BLitt) thesis, is a detailed study of the manuscript and proof-sheets of this very late work. Tracing the progress of the novel through its various editions, it reveals the full extent of Balzac's improvisation from novella to full-length masterpiece.

Illusions Perdues, a critical study of what is Balzac's most mature work, outlines its strong autobiographical element, analysing contrasts of Paris and the provinces, the purity of the artist's life and the corruptions of journalism, and the ambiguity of Balzac's narrative outlook. Major themes of the book are that in "fiction" is truth and in "truth" fiction, and that Illusions Perdues is the first novel by any writer to highlight the shaping of public opinion by the media, usually done in the pursuit of power or money.

Blaise Pascal considers its subject from biographical, theological, religious and mathematical points of view, including the standpoint of physics. There is a chapter on the argument of the Wager. The analysis is slightly inclined in a secular direction, giving greater emphasis to Pascal's concern with the contradictions of human nature, and rather less to his deep and traditional preoccupation with Original Sin. Since writing this book, Adamson has produced further work on Pascal's mathematical comprehension of God.

His historical writings fall into three categories: a monograph on Spanish art and French Romanticism, illuminating the opening-up of Spain and Spanish art to travellers from France and other parts of Western Europe, and to enthusiasts in those countries; articles on manorial and banking history; and, the modern workings of a City livery company. Adamson has also written on travel in England and Wales in the 18th century.

Dr Adamson's study of one year in the life of the celebrated artist Oskar Kokoschka has been published to critical acclaim, as have his recollections of Sir William Golding.

Philosophy of literature 
According to Adamson, literature does not need to fulfil any social mission or purpose; yet, as with Émile Zola or D. H. Lawrence, there is every reason why it can highlight social evils. A novel or novella – or a biography – is not merely an absorbing story: in Matthew Arnold's words, the best prose is, like poetry, "a criticism of life". This means that they convey some sort of philosophy of the world (in Arnold's words, "How to live"), though some writers, such as Adalbert Stifter and Jane Austen (to whom, incidentally, he is related through his mother do this less than most others, whilst on the other hand Samuel Beckett conveys a profoundly negative philosophy of life.

All too often, in Adamson's view, people go through their lives without living or seeking any belief which, for him, is the supreme attractiveness of Blaise Pascal, whose philosophy was of a unique kind: grounded in the vagaries of human nature; not essentially seeking to convince by mathematics; and foreshadowing Søren Kierkegaard and 20th-century existentialism in its appeal to human experience.

Bibliography 
Within a study of the art of autobiography he is writing an account of his own life (including his friendship with A.L. Rowse).   He has written eleven books as well as numerous articles.

Books
1966: The Genesis of "Le Cousin Pons"
1971: Dusty Heritage
1971: T. S. Eliot: a Memoir by Robert Sencourt (ed.)
1974: The House of Nell Gwyn: the fortunes of the Beauclerk family, 1670-1974 (jointly with Peter Beauclerk Dewar)
1980: A Rescue Policy for Museums
1981: Balzac: Illusions Perdues
1988: Les Romantiques français devant la peinture espagnole
(1990: republished as Interprètes français de la peinture espagnole à l'époque romantique)
1995: Blaise Pascal: mathematician, physicist, and thinker about God
1996: Rides Round Britain: the travel journals of John Byng (ed.)
2000: The Curriers' Company: a Modern History
2001: Balzac and the Tradition of the European Novel

Translations
1970: The Black Sheep (trans. Balzac's La Rabouilleuse)
1976: Ursule Mirouët (trans. Balzac), 2nd edn 2015
1993: Bed 29 & Other Stories: an anthology of 26 of  Maupassant's short stories

Other works
1972:  Stendhal and Balzac as Connoisseurs of Italian Art
1982:  Child's Bank and Oxford University in the Eighteenth Century
1989:  The Priest in Balzac's Fiction: Secular and Sacred Aspects of the Church
1991: Old Goriot presented in Everyman Books
1992: La Réception de La Comédie humaine en Grande-Bretagne au XXe siècle
2005: Pascal's Views on Mathematics and the Divine
2009: Oskar Kokoschka at Polperro
2010: William Golding Remembered
2010: Researching Kokoschka
2010: A Passage from Barcelona
2011: St John in Cornwall
2012: Meeting A.L. Rowse (this, somewhat modified, is one of the fifteen chapters of his forthcoming book on A.L. Rowse)
2013: Frank Heath, Artist of Polperro and Lamorna
2014: Belonging to the Curriers' Company
2014: A Year with the Curriers' Company, Part I
2014: A Year with the Curriers' Company, Part II 
2014: Rowse and Trevor-Roper defined
2014: Malta, its Knights and Grand Masters: Part I
2015: Malta, its Knights and Grand Masters: Part II
2015: In Memoriam: Raleigh Trevelyan
2015:  Cyprus: An Essay
2015:  Serendipity
2016:  A Visit to Venice
2016: A Visit to Provence and Languedoc
2016: The Godolphins
2017: The Dukes of Leeds
2017: Elba: Two Centuries On
2018: Napoleon at Elba

References

External links 

 Debrett's People of Today
 www.sal.org.uk
 www.rslit.org
 www.royalhistoricalsociety.org

1939 births
Living people
People from Culcheth
People from Lymm
People educated at Manchester Grammar School
Alumni of Magdalen College, Oxford
Paris-Sorbonne University alumni
Academics of the University of London
Fellows of Wolfson College, Cambridge
Historians of French literature
English justices of the peace
Knights of Justice of the Order of St John
English biographers
21st-century British historians
French–English translators
English literary historians
Academics of Goldsmiths, University of London
English male non-fiction writers
Fellows of the Royal Society of Literature
Fellows of the Society of Antiquaries of London
Fellows of the Royal Historical Society
Chevaliers of the Ordre des Palmes Académiques
Recipients of the Order pro Merito Melitensi
Officiers of the Ordre des Arts et des Lettres